Daniel Gutiérrez Castorena (born 20 December 1954) is a Mexican politician who is the MORENA Senator from Aguascalientes.

Education 
He graduated from the National Autonomous University of Mexico, the Autonomous University of Zacatecas, the Autonomous University of Aguascalientes and Universidad Autónoma Metropolitana.

References 

1954 births
Living people
21st-century Mexican politicians
Morena (political party) politicians
Politicians from Aguascalientes
Senators of the LXIV and LXV Legislatures of Mexico
National Autonomous University of Mexico alumni
Autonomous University of Zacatecas alumni
Autonomous University of Aguascalientes alumni
Universidad Autónoma Metropolitana alumni
Academic staff of the Autonomous University of Aguascalientes
Academic staff of the Autonomous University of Nuevo León